Slovak Evangelical Church in Šid in Vojvodina, Serbia, is a Lutheran church built in 1910. Over the years, it was the main church for the Lutheran Christians, with other churches in the town being either Eastern Orthodox, Roman Catholic, or Greek Catholic. The church and its parish played a prominent role during the time of immigration of Slovaks to town in mid-19th century, helping them in maintaining their spiritual and national identity. Before the establishment of the local Slovak parish in 1897, the local community was a part of the nearby Bingula parish. Later on, the Šid church was a main church for up to 24 other associated communities in the regions of Syrmia, Semberia, and Slavonia including in Bosut, Jamena, Komletinci, Bijeljina, Vašica, Sot, and Višnjićevo. It is not known when and from whom exactly the plot of land for the church was purchased, but some data indicates it belonged to the local Jewish community. The church building was built during 1909 and 1910 and was consecrated in August 1910.

See also
 Protestantism in Serbia
 Slovaks of Serbia
 Evangelical Lutheran Church of the Augsburg Confession, Kisač
 Slovak Evangelical Church of the Augsburg Confession in Serbia
 Evangelical Reformed Church in Šidski Banovci

References

Protestantism in Serbia
Lutheran churches in Europe
Slovaks of Vojvodina
Churches completed in 1910
20th-century churches in Serbia
Šid